Alto Baudó is a municipality and town in the Chocó Department, Colombia.

The municipality contains part of the Utría National Natural Park.

Climate
Alto Baudó has a very wet tropical rainforest climate (Af). The following data is for Pie de Pato, the capital of the municipality.

References

Municipalities of Chocó Department